Jhett may refer to:

 JHETT (DJ), Japanese DJ and producer of the 2005 song "Just Go"
 Jhett Tolentino (born 1976), Filipino entertainment producer
 Jack E. Jett (1956–2015), American model and television personality

Masculine given names